William Whitman may refer to:
 William Francis Whitman Jr., horticulturist
 William Merrill Whitman, lawyer for the Panama Canal Zone